A quadriceps tendon rupture is a tear of the tendon that runs from the quadriceps muscle to the top of the knee cap.

Signs and symptoms
Symptoms are pain and the inability to extend the knee against resistance. A gap can often be palpated at the tendon's normal location.

Diagnosis
The diagnosis is usually made clinically, but ultrasound or MRI can be used if there is any doubt.

Treatment
The tendon can be surgically repaired. Afterwards a brace is given that prevents flexion of the knee. Athletes who have had this injury generally return to action in about 9 months to a year.

References

External links 

Dislocations, sprains and strains
Soft tissue disorders
Injuries of hip and thigh